Florence County is a county located in the U.S. state of Wisconsin. As of the 2020 census, the population was 4,558, making it the second-least populous county in Wisconsin after Menominee County. Its county seat is Florence.

Florence County is part of the Iron Mountain, MI–WI Micropolitan Statistical Area.

History
Florence County was created by the legislature of 1882 from portions of Marinette County and Oconto County. The first white man to document his journey through Florence County was Thomas J. Cram, who surveyed northeast Wisconsin in 1840 and 1841. The region belonged to the Menominee tribe, who mingled with the Chippewa there. Florence County continued to be a region for hunting and trapping until the 1870s when iron was discovered in the region. The Florence mine was discovered in 1874 by H. D. Fisher. In 1879, Fisher named the mine and town after the wife of Nelson Powell Hulst, Florence Terry Hulst, establishing the name for the county as well.

Geography

Adjacent counties
 Iron County, Michigan - north
 Dickinson County, Michigan - east
 Marinette County, Wisconsin - southeast
 Forest County, Wisconsin - southwest

Major highways
  U.S. Highway 2
  U.S. Highway 141
  Highway 70
  Highway 101
  Highway 139

Buses
List of intercity bus stops in Wisconsin

National protected area
 Nicolet National Forest (part)

Demographics

2020 census
As of the census of 2020, the population was 4,558. The racial makeup of the county was 94.6% White, 0.7% Native American, 0.2% Black or African American, 0.2% Asian, 0.2% Pacific Islander, 0.3% from other races, and 3.9% from two or more races. Ethnically, the population was 1.4% Hispanic or Latino of any race.

2000 census

At the 2000 census there were 5,088 people, 2,133 households, and 1,441 families in the county.  The population density was 10 people per square mile (4/km2).  There were 4,239 housing units at an average density of 9 per square mile (3/km2).  The racial makeup of the county was 98.17% White, 0.16% Black or African American, 0.43% Native American, 0.28% Asian, 0.02% Pacific Islander, 0.14% from other races, and 0.81% from two or more races.  0.45% of the population were Hispanic or Latino of any race. 25.6% were of German, 11.6% Swedish, 8.4% Polish, 8.2% Italian, 6.6% French, 5.9% English, 5.4% French Canadian and 5.2% Irish ancestry.
Of the 2,133 households 27.50% had children under the age of 18 living with them, 58.60% were married couples living together, 6.00% had a female householder with no husband present, and 32.40% were non-families. 27.90% of households were one person and 12.50% were one person aged 65 or older.  The average household size was 2.35 and the average family size was 2.87.

The age distribution was 22.90% under the age of 18, 5.30% from 18 to 24, 27.10% from 25 to 44, 27.30% from 45 to 64, and 17.50% 65 or older.  The median age was 42 years. For every 100 females, there were 104.30 males.  For every 100 females age 18 and over, there were 101.50 males.

In 2017, there were 31 births, giving a general fertility rate of 57.9 births per 1000 women aged 15–44, the 21st lowest rate out of all 72 Wisconsin counties. 10 of the births were to unmarried mothers, 21 were to married mothers. Additionally, there were fewer than five reported induced abortions performed on women of Florence County residence in 2017.

Communities

Florence County is one of only two counties in Wisconsin with no incorporated communities, the other being Menominee County.

Towns

 Aurora
 Commonwealth
 Fence
 Fern
 Florence
 Homestead
 Long Lake
 Tipler

Unincorporated communities

 Aurora
 Commonwealth
 Fence
 Fern
 Hematite
 Pulp
 Ridgetop
 Spread Eagle
 Tipler
 Tyran

Politics

See also
 National Register of Historic Places listings in Florence County, Wisconsin

References

External links
 Florence County government website
 Florence County Tourism & Economic Development
 Florence County map from the Wisconsin Department of Transportation

 
1882 establishments in Wisconsin
Populated places established in 1882